Iraj Weeraratne (born 21 February 1981) is a Sinhalese R&B and hip hop artist and music producer. Weeraratne had a television show on Derana TV called "Iraj Show". He is known as a prominent hip-hop and RnB artist in Sri Lanka. He was the first person to introduce Sinhala rap as well as Tamil rap to Sri Lanka in 2004.

His first South Indian composition together with Vijay Anthony featured in the movie Veittakarran starring Kollywood star Vijay and was ranked number one in the Chennai Charts.

Career 
He won the best keyboardist title which was awarded by Guildhall Music School at the age of 16. He later teamed up with his schoolmates Ranidu Lankage and Yauwana Wigneswaran to form a band titled ‘’Zealots’’ while still studying at the Royal College, Colombo.He owns the Bongohd firm in Bangladesh. In August 2020, he was appointed as the board member of National Youth Service Council by Namal Rajapaksa and he was supposed to serve in the relevant position for a period of three years. However, a year later after his appointment he resigned from the position citing unavoidable poor work-related commitments.

Discography

Albums 
 Iraj - M Entertainments (2010)
 Chapter 02: Aloke - M Entertainments (2013)
 Manamali (2017)

Record labels 
 Universal Music Group
 Sony BMG Music Entertainment
 M-Entertainment

Popular music videos 

 Poo Pookum Tharunam
 Vise Kurutta
 Mathinta
 Mageimikari
 Thiruda
 J town story
 Sweety Manika
 Your love
 Just 1 Click
 Dekhechi
 Anuvhuti
 Timi Ra Ma
 Nachna
 Sina mal
 Yayata Payana
 Gemak Deela
 Ahankaara Nagare
 Aloke
 Behuli'
 Mama Sil bindagaththe Kathandare Giniyam r Ashawari'
 Aaradhana
 Wassana heee
 Yeanadi penne
 Cleaopatra
 Thurule Nidan'
 Danuna Hithumathe Mata Sithanna be Mr.Koththu Bambara Patikka - Hondata Math Una Dasa Themila Heena Penguna Lion NationHansiyeSewahaWarayoE HithaHithumatheMon Janey''

References

External links 
  Iraj at IMDb

1981 births
Alumni of Northumbria University
Living people
Sinhalese singers
Sri Lankan singer-songwriters